Wambrook is a locality in the Snowy Monaro Region, New South Wales, Australia. It is located in grasslands mainly to the northeast of the Snowy Mountains Highway, about 30 km southeast of Adaminaby and 25 km northwest of Cooma, situated at the foot of the ranges at an altitude of 865 m above mean sea level. It is about 140 km south of Canberra.

It had a school from 1892 to 1903 and from 1912 to 1928, described as a "provisional" school until March 1916 and subsequently as a "half-time" school.

References

Snowy Monaro Regional Council
Localities in New South Wales